Nicolae "Nicușor" Dumitru (12 December 1928 – 8 August 2005) was a Romanian striker and manager. 

He is the most successful Manager in Romania, winning the Romanian First League on 7 occasions, all with Dinamo București. Nicolae Dumitru also won two Romanian Cups, and went on to guide Dinamo to the European Cup semi-finals in the 1983–84 season. He has a total of 558 matches as manager in Divizia A.

Club career
Nicolae Dumitru was born on 12 December 1928 in Bucharest, Romania and he started playing football in 1945 at Sparta București in Divizia B, after two seasons going to play for Metalul București also in Divizia B, helping the team promote to Divizia A where he made his debut under coach Augustin Botescu on 22 August 1948 in a 6–1 loss against CFR Timișoara. He was transferred at Dinamo București in 1949 where he spent 10 seasons, in the 1955 Divizia A season helping the club win the first Divizia A title in its history, being used by coach Angelo Niculescu in 21 matches in which he scored two goals. He also won the 1958–59 Cupa României and played in the first European match of a Romanian team in the 1956–57 European Cup in the 3–1 victory against Galatasaray, helping The Red Dogs go to the next phase of the competition where they were eliminated by CDNA Sofia, against whom he scored a goal. On 23 August 1959, Dumitru played his last Divizia A match for Dinamo in a 0–0 against Minerul Lupeni, having a total of 191 matches in which he scored 56 goals in the competition.

International career
Nicolae Dumitru played 8 games at international level for Romania. He made his debut at the 1954 World Cup qualifiers under coach Gheorghe Popescu I, playing in three games, the first one was a 2–0 loss against Czechoslovakia, the second was a 3–1 victory against Bulgaria and the third was a 1–0 loss against Czechoslovakia. His following five games were friendlies, his last appearance was in a 1–1 against Bulgaria.

Managerial career

Nicolae Dumitru started his managerial career at Dinamo București, having several spells at the club, winning a total of 7 Divizia A titles and two Cupa României. He also guided Dinamo to the European Cup semi-finals in the 1983–84 season after eliminating Kuusysi Lahti, Hamburg who was the defending European Cup champion and Dinamo Minsk, before being eliminated with 3–1 on aggregate by Liverpool. Dumitru also coached Victoria București, SC Bacău, Argeș Pitești, Progresul Brăila and Progresul București in Divizia A, having a total of 558 matches as manager in the competition, consisting of 250 victories, 120 draws and 188 losses, his only coaching experience outside Romania was when he coached Ghana's national team from 1973 until 1974. Nicolae Dumitru died on 8 August 2005 in Bucharest at age 76.

Honours

Player
Metalul București
Divizia B: 1947–48
Dinamo București
Divizia A: 1955
Cupa României: 1958–59

Manager
Dinamo București
Divizia A: 1961–62, 1962–63, 1963–64, 1970–71, 1974–75, 1982–83, 1983–84
Cupa României: 1963–64, 1983–84

Notes

References

External links

Nicolae Dumitru player statistics at Labtof
Nicolae Dumitru manager statistics at Labtof

1928 births
2005 deaths
Footballers from Bucharest
Romanian footballers
Association football forwards
Liga I players
Liga II players
FC Dinamo București players
FC Sportul Studențesc București players
Romania international footballers
Romanian football managers
FC Dinamo București managers
FC Argeș Pitești managers
Victoria București managers
AFC Dacia Unirea Brăila managers
FC Progresul București managers
FCM Bacău managers
Ghana national football team managers
Romanian expatriate football managers